Maksim Vasilyevich Obozny (born 7 July 1986) is a Russian former professional football player.

Club career
He made his Russian Football National League debut for FC Sodovik Sterlitamak on 28 March 2007 in a game against FC Anzhi Makhachkala.

External links
 

1986 births
Sportspeople from Rostov-on-Don
Living people
Russian footballers
FC SKA Rostov-on-Don players
FC Metallurg Lipetsk players
FC Sodovik Sterlitamak players
FC Zvezda Irkutsk players
FC Irtysh Omsk players
FC Rostov players
Association football forwards
Association football midfielders
FC Chayka Peschanokopskoye players